The 2022 Basketball Champions League (BCL) Final Four was the 6th Basketball Champions League tournament and the 4th in the format of Final Four. It was the concluding phase of the 2021–22 Basketball Champions League season.

It was the first time the tournament was held in Bilbao, and the first time a neutral venue was used for the Final Four.

CB Canarias (known as Lenovo Tenerife for sponsorship reasons) won its second-ever BCL championship. Canarias' point guard Marcelo Huertas was named the Final Four MVP.

Venue
The Bilbao Arena hosted the final tournament for the first time.

Teams

Bracket

Semifinals

Third place game

Final

Notes

References

External links 
 Basketball Champions League (official website)

2021–22 Basketball Champions League
Basketball Champions League Final Four
Basketball Champions League Final Four
Champions League